John Chester Buttre (10 June 1821 Auburn, New York – 2 December 1893 Ridgewood, New Jersey), was an American steel-plate engraver and lithographer, responsible for some 3,000 engraved portraits of American political, naval and military personalities. He published "The American Portrait Gallery" in 3 volumes (1880–81) with text by his daughter, Lillian C. Buttre.

Biography
He received his first drawing tuition from Hulaniski, a Polish exile living in Auburn. Later he applied himself to the study of portrait-painting. He was, however, better suited to drawing and wood-engraving. His work improving, he carried on the business of general engraver, producing card-plates, wood-cuts for newspapers and engraving silver-ware. 

Arriving in New York in 1841, he devoted himself to steel-plate engraving, at which he soon became successful, his work appearing in many magazines and newspapers. He produced a widely acclaimed full-length portrait of President James Buchanan in 1858, together with a full-length portrait of Martha Washington. His Civil War work included sentimental images such as "The Empty Sleeve," "Only a Little Brook" and "Prayer in Camp," all of which sold well.

A resident of Ridgewood, New Jersey, Buttre died at his home there on December 2, 1893.

References

External links

Fine Arts Museum of San Francisco

1821 births
1893 deaths
American engravers
People from Ridgewood, New Jersey
19th-century American printmakers
19th-century engravers
People from Auburn, New York
Artists from New Jersey
Artists from New York (state)